Osmond is a surname of English origin. It is derived from Anglo-Saxon or Norman, itself from Old Norse Osmundr ; Osmund, a variant form of Old Norse Ásmundr.

Osmond family
The Osmond family, a Mormon family from Ogden, Utah whose members formed American pop group The Osmonds
First generation:
George Osmond (politician) (1836–1913), English-American politician
Third generation:
George Virl Osmond, Sr. (1917–2007), Osmond family patriarch
Olive Osmond (1925–2004), wife of George V. Osmond
Fourth generation:
All children of George V. and Olive Osmond
Virl Osmond (George Virl Osmond, Jr., born 1945), choreographer and missionary
Tom Osmond (born 1947), missionary and postal worker
Alan Osmond (born 1949), multi-instrumentalist and songwriter
Wayne Osmond (born 1951), guitarist and songwriter
Merrill Osmond (born 1953), lead vocalist, bassist and songwriter
Jay Osmond (born 1955), drummer and choreographer
Donny Osmond (born 1957), keyboardist and vocalist
Marie Osmond (born 1959), country singer and Broadway actress
Jimmy Osmond (born 1963), vocalist and businessman
Fifth generation:
Aaron Osmond (born 1969), politician and former member of Utah State senate, son of Virl
David Osmond (born 1979), musician and television personality, son of Alan

Other people

Andrew Osmond (novelist), British novelist
Cliff Osmond, American actor and screenwriter
Douglas Osmond, British Chief Constable
Floris Osmond, French engineer
Frank Osmond, Welsh rugby union and rugby league footballer
Humphry Osmond, British psychiatrist
JoAnn D. Osmond, American politician from Illinois
John Osmond, director of the Institute of Welsh Affairs
Kaetlyn Osmond, Canadian figure skater
Ken Osmond (1943–2020), American actor
Margy Osmond, Australian businesswoman
Timothy H. Osmond, American politician from Illinois, husband of JoAnn
William Osmond, 19th-century English sculptor

See also
Osmond (disambiguation)
Osmont
Osment
Osman (name)

References